Dongguan railway station may refer to:

 Dongguan railway station (Guangdong), in Dongguan, Guangdong, China
 Shangyu South railway station (formerly known as Dongguan railway station as the construction name), on the Hangzhou–Taizhou high-speed railway in Shangyu District, Shaoxing, Zhejiang, China
 Dongguanzhen railway station, on the Xiaoshan–Ningbo railway and Shaoxing Urban Rail Line in Shaoxing, Zhejiang, China
Changping railway station (Guangdong), known as Dongguan railway station until 2014

See also
 Dongguan East railway station, Changping, Dongguan, Guangdong, China
 Dongguan West railway station, Daojiao, Dongguan, Guangdong, China
 Changping Dongguan station, a station of the Beijing Subway in Changping District, Beijing, China
 Dongguang station, a metro station at Chengdu, Sichuan, China